El Mutakallimun (المتكلمون) is the sixth album of Souad Massi, the Algerian-born, Paris-based singer-songwriter, released in 2015. It is Massi's first album in classical Arabic. Poets range from Zuhayr bin Abī Sulmá the sixth century to Abu al-Qassim al-Shabbi in early twentieth century “To the Tyrants of the World.”

Track listing 
 "Bima el Taaloul" – 3:59 / بم التعلل   
 "Lastou Adri" - 3:39 / لست أدري
 "Ayna" - 3:42 / أبن 
 "Hadari" - 3:50 / حذاري
 "Saimtou" - 4:48 / سئمتُ
 "El Houriya" - 4:11 / الحرية 
 "Faya Layla" - 4:35 / فيا ليلى 
 "El Khaylou Wa El Laylou" - 3:47 / الخيل و البيداء 
 "El Boulbouli" - 4:17 / البلبل
 "Saaiche" - 3:37 / سأعيش

References

External links

Souad Massi albums
2015 albums